The felou gundi (Felovia vae) is a species of rodent in the family Ctenodactylidae. It is monotypic within the genus Felovia.

Distribution 
It is found in Mali, Mauritania, and Senegal.

Habitat 
Its natural habitats are dry savanna, subtropical or tropical dry shrubland, subtropical or tropical dry lowland grassland, and rocky areas.

References

felou gundi
Mammals of West Africa
felou gundi
Taxonomy articles created by Polbot
Taxa named by Fernand Lataste